The 35th British Academy Film Awards, given by the British Academy of Film and Television Arts in 1982, honoured the best films of 1981.

There are no records, and no explanation, showing any nominations nor winner for the BAFTA Award for Best Actress in a Supporting Role at this 35th film ceremony.

Winners and nominees

Statistics

See also
 54th Academy Awards
 7th César Awards
 34th Directors Guild of America Awards
 39th Golden Globe Awards
 2nd Golden Raspberry Awards
 8th Saturn Awards
 34th Writers Guild of America Awards

1981 film awards
1982 in British cinema
Film035
1981 awards in the United Kingdom